Danin is a town in Pakistan it may also refer to
Danin, Hama, a village in Syria
Danin (name)